Glenea niveipectus is a species of beetle in the family Cerambycidae. It was described by Per Olof Christopher Aurivillius in 1926.

Subspecies
 Glenea niveipectus albovittula Breuning, 1956
 Glenea niveipectus niveipectus Aurivillius, 1926
 Glenea niveipectus viridivittata Breuning, 1956

References

niveipectus
Beetles described in 1926